Emily Nakalema (born Emily Kyomugisha, 1994) is a Ugandan female boxer competing in the welterweight division. As of July 2019, she was the captain of Uganda's national female boxers team, the She Bombers. She is also a bronze medal winner at the 2020 African Boxing Olympic Qualification Tournament.

Background and education 
Emily Nakalema was born Emily Kyomugisha to Samuel and Teopista Kyomugisha in Mbarara and is the third born in a family of five. She attended Kulumba Primary School after which she joined Allied Secondary School for her first year of secondary school. She was later admitted to Citizen High School, Mbarara on a sports bursary after which she dropped out of school in 2016 and moved to Kampala city.

Involvement in sports 
Emily Nakalema started out playing football and featured for Mbarara United FC in regional tours before moving to Kampala and eventually taking up boxing in 2018.

She boxes under a local club, Katwe Boxing Club and has also represented Uganda at regional and continental level.

Honors 

 Gold medal – 2018 East African Community Games
 Bronze medal – 2020 African Boxing Olympic Qualification Tournament

References 

Ugandan women boxers
1994 births
Living people
People from Mbarara District
Welterweight boxers